PP-207 Khanewal-V is a Constituency of  Provincial Assembly of Punjab.

General elections 2013

General elections 2008

See also
 PP-206 Khanewal-IV
 PP-208 Khanewal-VI

References

External links
 Election commission Pakistan's official website
 Awazoday.com check result
 Official Website of Government of Punjab

Provincial constituencies of Punjab, Pakistan